Nakanoho Dam is a gravity dam located in Gifu Prefecture in Japan. The dam is used for flood control and water supply. The catchment area of the dam is 1.6 km2. The dam impounds about 5  ha of land when full and can store 411,000 cubic meters of water. Construction on the dam began in 1990 and was completed in 2005.

References

Dams in Gifu Prefecture